Pattiyude Divasam ((), (alternate title - A Dog's Day)) is a 2001 Indian political satire film directed by Murali Nair.

Plot
A local ruler bows down to the pressure from democratic forces and is forced to hand over a part of his province to a democratically elected leader. He also presents his pet dog to a poor peasant and his wife. For the poor peasant and his wife, the dog is not a mere dog, but a symbol of the royalty which had always inspired in them feelings of respect, admiration and blind worship. They bathe the dog in a very ceremonious manner and take much care of it. They even desist from tying it up. But when the dog bites and kills a duck and then a boy, it leads to problems. The democratic leader orders the arrest of the dog, followed by the arrest of the poor peasant. Then follow protests, talks, negotiations leading to more interesting developments.

Cast
 K. Krishna Kaimal as The Lord
 Thomas as Koran
 Lakshmi Raman as Koran's Wife
 Suhas Thayat as Democratic Leader
 Vinu Prasad

Release
It was screened in the Un Certain Regard section at the 2001 Cannes Film Festival. It was also screened at the 2001 Toronto International Film Festival and the 2001 Chicago International Film Festival.

Critical reception
The film met with critical praise. Unni R. Nair of the Screen magazine commented, "The film, shot in a totally rural background in Kuttanad, represents on a microscopic scale the state of affairs all over the world in the present day. Political developments, coup attempts, meaningless peace-talks and accords, third-party mediation - everything is taken up for discussion, of course, on a miniature level. And the film becomes a really thought-provoking, brilliant social and political satire. A highlight of the film is that it has got very good quality spot recording that renders it an air of naturality."

References

External links

2001 films
2001 comedy films
2000s Malayalam-language films
Films directed by Murali Nair
Indian satirical films